Dak-galbi, or spicy stir-fried chicken, is a popular Korean dish made by stir-frying marinated diced chicken in a gochujang-based sauce with sweet potatoes, cabbage, perilla leaves, scallions, tteok (rice cake), and other ingredients. In Korean, galbi means rib, and usually refers to braised or grilled short ribs. Dak-galbi is not made with chicken ribs, however, its name is rather a nickname the post-War dish gained. Many dak-galbi restaurants have round hot plates that are built into the tables. Lettuce and perilla leaves are served as ssam (wrap) vegetables.

History and etymology 
Although dak and galbi translate into "chicken" and "rib" respectively, the term dak-galbi does not refer to chicken ribs.

This dish was developed in the 1960s as grilled chicken-pieces, an inexpensive anju accompaniment to alcoholic drinks in small taverns on the outskirts of Chuncheon. It replaced the comparatively expensive gui dishes which were grilled over charcoal. Dak-galbi spread to Chuncheon's main districts, where the livestock industry was thriving and offered fresh ingredients with no need for refrigeration. As a relatively cheap dish served in large portions, it gained popularity with soldiers and students on a budget and earned the nickname "commoners' galbi " or "university student's galbi " in the 1970s.

The dish is a local specialty of Chuncheon, and is often referred to as Chuncheon-dak-galbi. An annual festival dedicated to dak-galbi is held in Chuncheon, where there is also a dak-galbi alley with a large number of dak-galbi restaurants.

See also 
 Korean cuisine
 Mak-guksu
 Andong jjimdak
 List of chicken dishes

References

External links 

  (Official website)

Chuncheon
Chicken dishes
Korean cuisine
Table-cooked dishes